Carol Day was a British soap opera comic strip, created by David Wright and Peter Meriton, and published from September 10, 1956 to May 25, 1967.

History and concept

Carol Day was published in The Daily Mail and syndicated in around 70 newspapers around the world. It featured the every-day adventures of a young blonde model, Carol Day. She had a wealthy uncle in the Caribbean, Marcus, who serves as her guardian and help.
David Wright drew the stories, while Peter Meriton provided the scripts.

Cast

 Carol Day: A young female model.

Family members
 Marcus Axel: Carol's uncle and guardian. He collects African art. 
 Richard Axel: Carol's uncle, who owns the Caribbean island Gabriela. 
 Cousin Hugo: Carol's cousin who is the black sheep of the family. He is an associate of con-man Vernon Flowers and always begs for money when he is at Carol's place.

Friends
 Michael Fletcher: A photographer and first fiancé of Carol.
 Joe Wilson: Australian photographer and Carol's second fiancé. 
 Charles Logan: A friend of Carol whom she fancies.
 Mark Lovell: A jazz musician. Brother of Nora Lovell.
 Nora Lovell: Carol's schoolmate and early roommate in London. Sister of Mark Lovell.
 Max Kessell: Mark Lovell's roommate and fellow musician.
 Adam Boone: A friend of Carol who is a reclusive sculptor.
 Clive Ellis: An artist and friend of Carol.
 Jack Slingsby: An artist and friend of Carol.
 Angela Logan: A friend of Carol who is a model.
 Baines: Butler of Marcus Axel. Carol often takes him in confidence.
 Humphrey Patcham
 Oswald Patcham: Son of Humphrey Patcham, who develops a crush on Carol. 
 Vernon Flowers: A con-man and a criminal who is a bad influence on Carol's cousin Hugo.

Side characters
 Arnold Tracy: An older man who tries to make Carol love him.
 Reverend William Evans: A vicar in Marcus Axel's village.
 Commander Black: A retired commander and good friend of Uncle Marcus. He is the father of Edward Black. 
 Edward Black: Son of Commander Black. He is a spoiled man. 
 Captain Riker: Friend of the Patcham who keeps over Oswald.
 Paul Egan: Head of a fashion house and Carol's main employer.
 June Egan: Wife of Paul Egan.
 Jennifer Egan: Daughter of Paul Egan. 
 Gillian Vane: Assistant of Paul Egan
 Henry Dietz: Owns a small Caribbean island. 
 Ian Carr: Sent down from Oxford in disgrace, stays with his mother Anne. 
 Peter Castle: Playwright and friend of Paul Egan. 
 Tim Privett: Friend of Uncle Richard. 
 Doctor Gomez: A black doctor who lives on the Caribbean island Gabriela.
 Sarah: Uncle Richard's black housekeeper.
 Joe Wilson
 Simon Ware: An assistant of Joe Wilson who suffers from mental problems. He develops an obsession with Carol.

Sources

British comic strips
1956 comics debuts
1967 comics endings
Day, Carol
Drama comics
Romance comics
Day, Carol
Day, Carol
Day, Carol
Day, Carol
Caribbean in fiction